John James Knox (3 April 1790 – 9 July 1856) was an Irish Tory politician from an aristocratic family based near Dungannon in County Tyrone. After a career as an officer in the British Army, he sat in the House of Commons of the United Kingdom in the 1830s as the Member of Parliament (MP) for his family's pocket borough of Dungannon.

References 

 https://www.historyofparliamentonline.org/volume/1820-1832/member/knox-hon-john-1790-1856

1790 births
1856 deaths
People from Dungannon
British Army officers
UK MPs 1830–1831
UK MPs 1831–1832
UK MPs 1832–1835
UK MPs 1835–1837
Irish Conservative Party MPs
Younger sons of earls
Members of the Parliament of the United Kingdom for County Tyrone constituencies (1801–1922)